Frederick Municipal Airport may refer to:

 Frederick Municipal Airport (Maryland) in Frederick, Maryland, United States (FAA/IATA: FDK)
 Frederick Municipal Airport (Oklahoma) in Frederick, Oklahoma, United States (FAA/IATA: FDR)